Claude Durand (1938–2015) was a French publisher, translator and writer.  He worked in the French film industry editing films, and occasionally writing and directing.

He published leading authors such as Solzhenitsyn and Houellebecq, and together with his wife Carmen, he translated the standard French edition of Gabriel Garcia Marquez's novel One Hundred Years of Solitude. As a writer, he won the 1979 Prix Médicis for his novel La Nuit zoologique.

As Solzhenitsyn's literary agent (Editions Fayard) since 2003 he acted as an intermediary with "Moscow" when Edward Ericson Jr. and Daniel Mahoney were preparing The Solzhenitsyn Reader. A substantial part of the notes (remarks) on the Journal of the Red Wheel are of his hand.

Selected filmography
 Anyone Can Kill Me (1957)
 Nathalie, Secret Agent (1959)

Publications 

 Agent de Soljenitsyne (Fayard, Paris 2011).

References

1938 births
2015 deaths
Writers from Paris
Publishers (people) from Paris
Prix Médicis winners